Monica Giorgi (born 3 January 1946) is an Italian former professional tennis player.

Biography
Born in Livorno, Giorgi twice reached the third round of the French Open during her career and played one Federation Cup tie for Italy, against Australia in the 1972 World Group quarter-finals. Giorgi was very politically active and wore an anti-apartheid shirt onto the court for the tie, which was held in South Africa, for which she was briefly banned by the Italian tennis federation.

Giorgi was jailed in the early 1980s for her association with anarchist group Azione Rivoluzionaria. Authorities accused her of being involved in an attempted kidnapping, as well as attempted murder for those injured in the attempt, but she was acquitted of all these charges due to insufficient evidence. She served around two years in prison.

See also
List of Italy Fed Cup team representatives

References

External links
 
 
 

1946 births
Living people
Italian female tennis players
Universiade medalists in tennis
Universiade silver medalists for Italy
Sportspeople from Livorno
Medalists at the 1967 Summer Universiade
Italian anarchists